Qeqertarsuaq or Herbert Island is an island in Baffin Bay near Qaanaaq in the Avannaata municipality, NW Greenland. The island has an area of 223 km2.

Qeqertarsuaq, meaning "Large Island", is the name of several other places in Greenland. It is also the name of an abandoned fishing village located near the eastern end of the island.

Geography
Herbert Island lies south of Cape Cleveland and is part of a small group formed by Northumberland Island, Hakluyt Island and Herbert Island.
The latter is the easternmost of the group. Aligned from east to west, the islands lie off the Inglefield Fjord, between the Murchison Sound to the north and the Hvalsund to the south. 

Herbert Island is located closest to the mouth of the Inglefield Fjord.

History
An account of life on the island in the 1970s is given by Marie Herbert in her 1973 book The Snow People, after she lived for a year in the (now abandoned) village of Qeqertarsuaq with her husband and young daughter.

See also
List of islands of Greenland

References

Islands of Greenland